Elinor Kershaw, also known as Nell and Elinor K. Ince, (November 19, 1884 – September 12, 1971) was an American stage and motion-picture actress; wife of Hollywood Mogul Thomas H. Ince, and mother of actor Richard Ince and writer Thomas H. Ince Jr. Her older sister was the stage actress Willette Kershaw. She built the Château Élysée in Los Angeles as a luxury long-term residential apartment house for movie stars.

She married actor Holmes Herbert in 1930; they later divorced.

Filmography
 The Love of Lady Irma (1910)
 Taming a Husband (1910)
 One Night and Then (1910)
 The Course of True Love (1910)
 Phone 1707 Chester (1911)

References

External links

 
 

1884 births
1971 deaths
Actresses from St. Louis
American silent film actresses
American stage actresses
20th-century American actresses